The Envy is a  fibreglass sailing dinghy that is sailed in Australia. It is often used as a training boat due to its simplicity but also has the option of a symmetrical spinnaker. 

The Envy is operated by the Australian Navy Cadets.

References

External links 

Dinghies